The former PanAmSat Corporation founded in 1984 by Reynold (Rene) Anselmo, was a satellite service provider headquartered in Greenwich, Connecticut, United States. It operated a fleet of communications satellites used by the entertainment industry, news agencies, internet service providers, government agencies, and telecommunication companies. Anselmo got the idea for PanAmSat from Norm Leventhal, a communications lawyer in Washington, D.C., to whom he had turned to for advice regarding difficulties he was encountering in getting reasonably priced satellite transmission for his Spanish International Network (SIN), the current-day Univision. Anselmo financed the entire project himself and Leventhal's law firm, hiring Martin Rothblatt for special satellite technical advice, filed for approval from the Federal Communications Commission (FCC) and lining up an initial satellite from RCA Astro-Electronics and a heavily discounted launch from Arianespace.

PanAmSat effectively broke the monopoly on international satellite communications which was held by INTELSAT, an international treaty-based organization founded and owned by several countries including the United States. PanAmSat, led by Anselmo, successfully lobbied the United States Congress to permit it to operate globally, competing against INTELSAT. Univision would also gain a nationwide cable audience through PanAmSat's efforts, gaining a head start in Spanish-language television in the United States and remaining the #1 Spanish network to this day.

Following the death of Rene Anselmo in 1995, his widow Mary Anselmo controlled the company for a time. PanAmSat was sold to Hughes Electronics, a division of General Motors, in a US$3 billion cash and stock deal. The satellite operations continued to be under PanAmSat with Hughes being the majority shareholder. In May 1997, Hughes Communication Galaxy merged with PanAmSat, adding 9 more satellites to its fleet. In 2003, News Corporation purchased Hughes Electronic's PanAmSat division and on 24 April 2004 sold PanAmSat to a consortium of private equity firms in a leveraged buyout including Kohlberg Kravis Roberts & Co. (KKR), Carlyle Group and Providence Equity Partners for US$4.3 billion.

2004 leveraged buyout 
KKR led the 2004 leveraged buyout by purchasing a 44% stake in the company. Carlyle and Providence each invested 27% with management representing the remainder of the equity. The consortium invested only US$550 million in equity, financing the remainder through bank loans and bonds. The transaction closed in August 2004. One month after the buyout, the company issued an additional US$250 million in discount notes which were used to pay the consortium dividends. Three months later, PanAmSat filed an initial public offering with the Securities and Exchange Commission (SEC).

In an ironic twist of fate, its private equity owners sold PanAmSat to its archrival INTELSAT in August 2005 for a total of US$4.3 billion in a deal finally consummated in July 2006. At the time of its sale, PanAmSat was the world's leading carrier of TV channels. In combination with INTELSAT (which had also gone private under private equity ownership in 2001), the new company — called Intelsat — is the world's largest commercial satellite company, with 53 spacecraft serving over 200 countries, with nearly 1400 employees.

In March 2007, Forbes magazine estimated the net worth of Rene Anselmo's widow, Mary Anselmo at US$1 billion. Anselmo, 78, lives in Greenwich, Connecticut.

Satellite Fleet

References

External links 
 Official website
 SPACE.com article

Intelsat
Communications satellite operators
American companies established in 1984
Defunct companies based in Connecticut
Defunct companies based in Washington, D.C.
Private equity portfolio companies
The Carlyle Group companies
Wilton, Connecticut
2006 mergers and acquisitions